The 1949 election for Mayor of Los Angeles took place on April 5, 1949, with a run-off election on May 31, 1949. Incumbent Fletcher Bowron was re-elected.

Municipal elections in California, including Mayor of Los Angeles, are officially nonpartisan; candidates' party affiliations do not appear on the ballot.

Election 
Bowron announced his candidacy for a fourth full term in office, with State Senator Jack Tenney, City Engineer Lloyd Aldrich, and Board of Education member Olin Darby also announcing their intentions to run against Bowron. In the primary, Bowron and Aldritch advanced to the general runoff election. Tenney, the head of the House Un-American Activities Committee, was opposed by the AFL Central Labor Council and came in third. In the runoff election, Bowron defeated Aldritch by a smaller margin, with Bowron calling the election the "dirtiest in [his] experience," due to him and Aldrich being political enemies.

Results

Primary election

General election

References and footnotes

External links
 Office of the City Clerk, City of Los Angeles

1949
Los Angeles
Los Angeles mayoral election
Mayoral election
Los Angeles mayoral election